Andrea Marcon (born 6 February 1963 in Treviso, Italy) is an Italian conductor, organist, harpsichordist, and scholar. In 1997, he founded the Venice Baroque Orchestra. Marcon studied at the Schola Cantorum Basiliensis. He was awarded the Handel Prize in 2021.

Recordings
 Handel: Parnasso in festa. Andrea Marcon, David Hansen, Robin Johannsen, Kangmin Justin Kim, Jenny Högstrom, Silke Gäng, Francesca Ascioti, Luca Tittoto, La Cetra Barockorchester Basel, La Cetra Vokalensemble Basel. PENTATONE PTC 5186643 (2017).
 Vivaldi and others: Andromeda liberata (serenata)
 Vivaldi: Opera arias, with Magdalena Kožená
 Handel: Ah! mio cor (opera arias), with Magdalena Kožená
 Vivaldi: Several concerto recordings with Giuliano Carmignola (violin)

References

External links
 Andrea Marcon official website
 Venice Baroque Orchestra official website
 Venice Baroque Orchestra on Alliance Artist Management

Italian performers of early music
Italian harpsichordists
Italian classical organists
Male classical organists
Italian male conductors (music)
Academic staff of Schola Cantorum Basiliensis
People from Treviso
1963 births
Living people
21st-century Italian conductors (music)
21st-century Italian male musicians
21st-century organists
Italian expatriates in Switzerland
Echo (music award) winners
Handel Prize winners